Sports in Somaliland are popular from both the participation and spectating aspect. Some popular sports in Somaliland are football, track and field and basketball. Among all sport in Somaliland, the most popular one is football. Sporting events in Somaliland are organised by the Somaliland's Ministry of Youth and Sports. Somaliland hosts the Somaliland Regional Games, a multi-sport event every two or four years. The participants of this event are the athletes from all regions of Somaliland.

See also

Somaliland Football Association
Somaliland Regional Games
Somaliland national football team
Ministry of Youth and Sports

References

Sport in Somaliland
Culture of Somaliland